Kispirit is a village in Veszprém county, Hungary.

History
The settlement was first mentioned in 1532, The bell tower dates from 1737. In 1739 the church tower was built. Folklore suggests that Kispirit Inn was frequented by the last famous outlaw of the region, Joska Acid.

References 
 Street map (Hungarian)

External links 
 Aerial view

Populated places in Veszprém County